Taiwanese Mandopop boyband JPM has released two studio albums as of 2012.

After they had separated from the Lollipop group in 2009, former members Qiu Wang Zi and Liao Xiao Jie had been undergoing a series of secret training. On the day of A Legend Star's first anniversary, the two of them decided to get back together and form a new group called JPM, alongside Qiu Wang Zi's brother, Mao Di, on January 11, 2011. While the two members were part of Lollipop before, Qiu Mao Di was a former member of Choc7 group until 2010.

On August 26, 2011, JPM released Moonwalk album. Their single, Moonwalk features a million-dollar music video in which the boys perform a spectacular "space dance" tailor-made for them by famous Taiwan dance choreographer Terry Lin.  Aside from the music video, JPM members also contributed with the making of their album as Liao filled the role of the producer for part of the album, while Qiu Wang Zi is the lyricist of three songs and composer of two songs in the album. In addition with the ten songs listed, the album also includes a Cantonese version of "因為有你" (Because of You). On August 29, three days after its release, the album sales reached more than 50,000 copies. On January 25, JPM released a Japanese version for Moonwalk album. The album consists of Normal Edition and First Press Limited Edition, which comes with a bonus DVD containing five music videos, one-hour music special, and interview footage.

On November 30, JPM released their second studio album entitled 365 under the same label, Sony Music Taiwan. They use "Love" as the main theme of this album. In other words, each song is used to describe different types and stages of love. In addition with the theme of love, 365 album also emphasized the "Golden Triangle" concept to capture each members' individual firm and confidence and also to represent their strong brotherhood. According to Sony Music, JPM said: "We are the Golden triangle, the best ally and best friend" (「我們是黃金鐵三角，是最好的戰友也是最好的朋友」). Demonstrating the trio's mastery of a multitude of music styles, the new album's track list includes an electro-dance K-Pop-styled titular song "365 Days" especially produced by Korean producers. Moreover, the track list also includes a solo song for each member, and a collaboration with Kimberley Chen entitled "Internet". Once again, Liao and Qiu Wang Zi took part in putting the album together as Liao filled the role of the producer for half of the album, lyricist of three songs and the composer of two songs, while Qiu is the lyricist of the main song, 365, of the album.

Studio albums

Music videos

See also
 JPM
 Liao Xiao Jie/Liljay
 Qiu Wang Zi/Prince
 Qiu Mao Di
 Lollipop F
 Choc7

References

External links
  JPM at Sony Music
 

Discographies of Taiwanese artists
Mandopop discographies